Adolf Rysler (1893 – January 1949) was a Swiss sprinter. He competed in the men's 4 × 100 metres relay at the 1920 Summer Olympics.

References

1893 births
1949 deaths
Athletes (track and field) at the 1920 Summer Olympics
Swiss male sprinters
Olympic athletes of Switzerland
Place of birth missing